Cajuput oil is a volatile oil obtained by distillation from the leaves of the myrtaceous trees Melaleuca leucadendra, Melaleuca cajuputi, and probably other Melaleuca species. The trees yielding the oil are found throughout Maritime Southeast Asia and over the hotter parts of the Australian continent. The majority of the oil is produced on the Indonesian island of Sulawesi. The name "cajeput" is derived from its Malay name,  or "white wood".

Production and uses
The oil is prepared from of cajeput leaves and twigs macerated in water, and steam distilled after fermenting for a night. The resulting oil is extremely pungent, flammable, and has the odor of a mixture of turpentine, eucalyptus and camphor. It consists mainly of cineol (see terpenes), from which cajuputene, having a hyacinth-like odor, can be obtained by distillation with phosphorus pentoxide. It is a typical volatile oil, and is used internally in doses of 2 to 3 minims, for the same purposes as clove oil.

Medicinal Uses  
Pain management using Cajeput oil works by causing surface warmth and irritation through the help of a chemical called cineole. It is frequently employed externally as a counterirritant. It is an ingredient in some liniments for sore muscles such as Tiger Balm and Indonesian traditional medicine . It is also used as an ingredient in inhalants/decongestants and topical pain/inflammation remedies such as Olbas Oil. In regards to direct application, cajeput oil can be applied to large areas of skin (after completing a patch test), minor wounds, scratches, and rashes. Cajeput oil can also be mixed with liquids like antiseptic lotions to treat rheumatism  and shampoo for hair care.

Benefits  
While essential oils like cajeput oil are not regulated by the Food and Drug Administration (FDA), there are alleged benefits to using it. For skin, cajeput has been researched to have anti-septic and antibacterial qualities. This helps remedy minor cuts and scratches which helps prevent infection. Cajeput oil may also have anti-inflammatory effects to help skin conditions like psoriasis and acne, although this research is not well established. Other alleged benefits of Cajeput oil include: toothaches, muscle soreness, joint pain, toothaches, sinusitis, common cold, cough, anxiety, and stress.

Potential Side Effects  
Like other essential oils, Cajeput oil produces similar natural side effects. These include skin rashes, redness, irritation, burning, and hives. Topical use should be used cautiously and through a carrier oil. As directed by the National Association for Holistic Aromatherapy, topical use should “Start with three to six drops per ounce of carrier oil. If you don’t have sensitive skin, you can gradually increase this amount up to 15 drops.”. One should also avoid direct inhalation as Cajeput oil is strong enough to cause or worsen respiratory issues especially for pregnant or breastfeeding women, children, and pets.

Drug Interactions 

Cajeput oil can change the metabolism abilities of the liver for certain medications through the Cytochrome P450 system. Drug interactions with Cajeput oil can potentially cause stronger or weaker adverse effects depending on the medication being broken down by the liver.

For fish 

Cajeput is used for the treatment of bacterial or fungal infections in fish. Common brand names containing Cajeput are Melafix and Bettafix. Melafix is a stronger concentration and Bettafix is a lower concentration that makes it harder to overdose smaller fish, especially bettas. It is most commonly used to promote fin and tissue regrowth, but is also effective in treating other conditions, such as fin rot or velvet. The remedy is used mostly on betta fish.

See also 
 Tea tree oil – derived from Melaleuca alternifolia

References

Essential oils